Henry Bourchier, 2nd Earl of Essex, 6th Baron Bourchier, 3rd Count of Eu and 2nd Viscount Bourchier KG KB PC (died 13 March 1539) was an English soldier, peer and courtier at the courts of Henry VII and Henry VIII. He married Mary Say, by whom he had one child, Anne, who became his heir.

Family
Bourchier was the son of William Bourchier, Viscount Bourchier and Anne Woodville. He was born between 1472. Through his mother, he was the nephew of Elizabeth Woodville, queen consort to Edward IV. He inherited the titles of 2nd Earl of Essex, 6th Baron Bourchier, 3rd Count of Eu and 2nd Viscount Bourchier from his grandfather Henry Bourchier, 1st Earl of Essex on his death in 1483.  He married twice, about 1512 to Mary Say(e) (1474-1535), then about 1536 to Mary Blount (1498-1555).

Career

Bourchier was a member of Henry VII's privy council. He was present at the Siege of Boulogne in 1492 and five years later led a detachment against the rebels at Blackheath. When Henry VIII became king, he was made captain of the new bodyguard.

In 1513, he commanded the cavalry vanguard at the Battle of the Spurs, where he ordered the charge which routed the French gendarmes. As Lieutenant-general of the Spears, he was subsequently present at the sieges of Terouanne and Tournai and was appointed Chief Captain of the King's forces the following year. in 1520 he was part of King Henry's entourage when he met in France with the French king at the Field of the Cloth of Gold, where he carried the Sword of State.

He was one of the judges at the trial in 1521 of Edward Stafford, 3rd Duke of Buckingham, when the latter was tried on a charge of treason. Bourchier received the manor of Bedminster as his share of the Duke's forfeited estates.

In March 1539, he broke his neck after falling from his horse and died from his injury and was buried at Little Easton church in Essex. Without male issue, his earldom and his countship became extinct. His barony was inherited by his daughter Anne, who had married William Parr, Baron Parr of Kendal, brother of Queen Katherine Parr, who was created Earl of Essex in 1543 and Marquess of Northampton in 1547. Anne later separated from her husband.

References

|-

15th-century births
1540 deaths
02
06
Knights of the Garter
Members of the Privy Council of England
Henry Bourchier, 2nd Earl of Essex
Woodville family
16th-century English soldiers
English soldiers
15th-century English people
16th-century English nobility
Deaths by horse-riding accident in England